António Costa (born 1961) is a Portuguese lawyer and the Prime Minister of Portugal.

António Costa may also refer to:
 António Bernardo da Costa Cabral, 1st Marquis of Tomar (1803–1889), Portuguese statesman
 Antonio Costa (painter) (1847–1915), Italian painter
 Antonio Maria Costa (born 1941), Italian economist
 António Costa Silva (born 1952), Portuguese professor of Engineering, businessman and politician
 António Costa Pinto (born 1953), Portuguese political scientist
 António Luís Costa (born 1953), Portuguese serial killer
 Luis Antonio Costa (born 1953), Argentine field hockey player
 Marcos Antônio Costa "Preto" (born 1978), Brazilian footballer
 António Miguel Costa (born 1984), Portuguese volleyball player in the 2005 FIVB Volleyball World League
 Yuri Antonio Costa da Silva (born 1996), Brazilian footballer